Winston Overton (October 4, 1870 – September 9, 1934) was a justice of the Louisiana Supreme Court from July 5, 1921, to September 9, 1934.

Born in Marksville, Louisiana, Overton was the City Attorney for Lake Charles, Louisiana from 1899 to 1907, becoming a judge of the state's Fifteenth Judicial District in 1908. In this position, he presided over the grand jury and trial of union workers who were involved in the Grabow riot, which had led to four deaths. He pressed for charges to only be brought against members of the union.

He was a delegate to the Louisiana Constitutional Convention of 1921, for which he chaired the Judiciary Committee.

He was the brother of Senator John H. Overton.

References

1870 births
1934 deaths
People from Marksville, Louisiana
Justices of the Louisiana Supreme Court